Udria is a village in Narva-Jõesuu, Ida-Viru County in northeastern Estonia.

See also
Battle of Utria

References

 
Villages in Ida-Viru County